Sean Rutgerson (born 9 February 1978) is the head coach of the United States and a former professional rugby league footballer. Over his career, Rutgerson played for the North Sydney Bears and the Canberra Raiders in the Australian National Rugby League, Salford City Reds in the  Super League and the Jacksonville Axemen in the AMNRL.

Playing career
Rutgerson started his professional career in Australia with the North Sydney, where he played. After two years at North Sydney, he moved to the Canberra Raiders where he spent four years and scored his first try at the top level.

He signed for Salford City Reds in 2004 and played three seasons in Super League. He then moved to the US, where he played for the Jacksonville Axemen and also took on a coaching role at the club.

In the 2000 Rugby League World Cup Rutgerson represented South Africa.

Coaching
Rutgerson was appointed assistant coach of the USA national team under Brian McDermott in 2015, eventually taking over from McDermott as head coach in 2018.

References

External links
Salford Squad Profile: Sean Rutgerson
Salford City Reds Website Homepage

1978 births
Living people
Australian expatriate rugby league players
Australian expatriate sportspeople in the United States
Australian people of South African descent
Australian rugby league coaches
Australian rugby league players
Canberra Raiders players
Expatriate rugby league players in the United States
Jacksonville Axemen coaches
Jacksonville Axemen players
North Sydney Bears players
Place of birth missing (living people)
Rugby league props
Rugby league second-rows
Salford Red Devils players
South Africa national rugby league team players
United States national rugby league team coaches